Olivier Niyonzima (born 1 January 1993) is a Rwandan football midfielder who currently plays for AS Kigali. He was a squad member for the 2017 CECAFA Cup and the 2020 African Nations Championship.

International career

International goals
Scores and results list Rwanda's goal tally first.

References 

1993 births
Living people
Rwandan footballers
Rwanda international footballers
Isonga F.C. players
Rayon Sports F.C. players
APR F.C. players
Association football midfielders
Rwanda A' international footballers
2020 African Nations Championship players